Cinclidotyphis is a genus of sea snails, marine gastropod mollusks in the family Muricidae, the murex snails or rock snails.

Species
Species within the genus Cinclidotyphis include:

 Cinclidotyphis myrae DuShane, 1969

References

 
Monotypic gastropod genera